The Campeonato Argentino de Rugby 1981 was won by selection of Buenos Aires that beat in the final the selection of Unión de Rugby de Tucumàn

Rugby Union in Argentina in 1981

National 
 The Buenos Aires Champsionship was won by C.A.S.I.
 The Cordoba Province Championship was won by Tala
 The North-East Championship was won by Lawn Tennis
 The selection of Buenos Aires won also the "Campeonato Juvenil" (under-19)

International
 England made a tour in Argentina played two times against "Pumas" in Buenos Aires . The Pumas made an historical draw in the first and lost the second.

Preliminaries

Zone A

Zone B

Zone C

Zone D

Interzone

Semifinals

Final

External links 
 Memorias de la UAR 1981
 Francesco Volpe, Paolo Pacitti (Author), Rugby 2000, GTE Gruppo Editorale (1999)

Campeonato Argentino de Rugby
Argentina
Rugby